The 2021 Uzbekistan Cup is the 29th season of the annual Uzbekistan Cup, the knockout football cup competition of Uzbekistan. The cup winner qualifies for a place in the 2022 AFC Champions League.

First qualifying round

Second qualifying round

Third qualifying round

Group stage

Group A

Group B

Group D

Group E

Group F

Group G

Round of 16

Quarter-finals

Semi-finals

Final

References

External links

Uzbek Cup News, (Russian)
Uzbek Cup Results, (Russian)
Soccerway.com

Cup
Uzbekistan
Uzbekistan Cup